Computer University, Loikaw is a university in Loikaw, Kayah State, Burma. It is near the Loikaw Airport. It was founded as the Government Computer College on February 21, 2001, and it became a university on January 20, 2007.

Academic departments

 Faculty of Software Department
 Faculty of Hardware Department
 Faculty of Information Science Department
 Myanmar Department
 English Department

Programs

Postgraduate

Graduate degrees

Undergraduate program

External links
 Official site

Technological universities in Myanmar